The 2012–13 season are the Esteghlal Football Club's 12th season in the Iran Pro League, and their 19th consecutive season in the top division of Iranian football. They are also competing in the Hazfi Cup and AFC Champions League, and 68th year in existence as a football club.

Club

Kit 

|
|
|
|}

Coaching staff

Other information

Grounds

Player

First team squad
Last updated: 5 January 2012

Iran Pro League squad
As of 31 January 2013. Esteghlal F.C. Iran Pro League Squad 2011–12

AFC Champions League squad
As of 23 June 2013. Esteghlal F.C. Champions League Squad 2012–13

Transfers 
Confirmed transfers 2012–13

Summer 

In:

Out:

Winter 

In:

Out:

Competitions

Overview

Competition record

Iran Pro League

Standings

Results summary

Results by round

Matches

AFC Champions League

Group stage

Group D

Knockout stage

Hazfi Cup

Matches

Friendly Matches

Statistics

Appearances 

|-
|colspan="14"|Players sold or loaned out after the start of the season:

|}

Top scorers
Includes all competitive matches. The list is sorted by shirt number when total goals are equal.

Last updated on 23 March 2013

Friendlies and Pre season goals are not recognized as competitive match goals.

Disciplinary record
Includes all competitive matches. Players with 1 card or more included only.

Last updated on 23 March 2013

Goals conceded 
 4 April 2013

Overall statistics
{|class="wikitable" style="text-align: center;"
|-
!
!Total
! Home
! Away
! Neutral
|-
|align=left| Games played || 45 || 26 || 19 || 0
|-
|align=left| Games won || 28 || 16 || 12 || 0
|-
|align=left| Games drawn || 11 || 4 || 7 || 0
|-
|align=left| Games lost || 7 || 4 || 3 || 0
|-
|align=left| Biggest win || 5 – 0 Fajr Sepasi5 – 0 Aboumoslem || 5 – 0 Aboumoslem || 5 – 0 Fajr Sepasi ||N/A
|-
|align=left| Biggest loss || 0 – 2 Tractor Sazi || 2 – 3 Foolad || 2 – 0 Tractor Sazi || N/A
|-
|align=left| Biggest win (League) || 5 – 0 Fajr Sepasi || 2 – 0 Paykan || 5 – 0 Fajr Sepasi || N/A
|-
|align=left| Biggest win (Cup) || 5 – 0 Aboumoslem || 5 – 0 Aboumoslem || 1 – 0 Gahar Zagros || N/A
|-
|align=left| Biggest win (Asia) || 3 – 0 Al-Rayyan SC || 3 – 0 Al-Rayyan SC || N/A || N/A
|-
|align=left| Biggest loss (League) || 0 – 2 Tractor Sazi || 2 – 3 Foolad || 0 – 2 Tractor Sazi || N/A
|-
|align=left| Biggest loss (Cup) || N/A || N/A || N/A || N/A
|-
|align=left| Biggest loss (Asia) || N/A || N/A || N/A || N/A
|-
|align=left| Clean sheets || 28 || 16 || 12 || 0
|-
|align=left| Goals scored || 68 || 36 || 32 || 0
|-
|align=left| Goals conceded || 26 || 12 || 14 || 0
|-
|align=left| Goal difference || 42 || 24  || 18  || 0
|-
|-
|-
|align=left| Points || 66 || 36  || 30  || 0
|-
|align=left| Winning rate || 62% || 66% || 57% || N/A
|-
|align=left| Most appearances || style="text-align:left;" colspan="4"| Mehdi Rahmati 45 appearances 
|-
|align=left| Most minutes played || style="text-align:left;" colspan="4"| Mehdi Rahmati 4050 minutes
|-
|align=left| Top scorer || style="text-align:left;" colspan="4"| Arash Borhani 15 goals 
|-
|align=left| Top assister || style="text-align:left;" colspan="4"| Mojtaba Jabari 11 assists

Awards

Team

Player

Manager

See also
 2012–13 Persian Gulf Cup
 2012–13 Hazfi Cup
 2013 AFC Champions League

References

External links
Iran Premier League Statistics
Persian League

2012–13
Iranian football clubs 2012–13 season